Ferdinand Devèze (23 June 1932 – 5 February 1999) was a French racing cyclist. He rode in the 1957 Tour de France.

References

1932 births
1999 deaths
French male cyclists
Place of birth missing